Lee is an American brand of denim jeans, first produced in 1889 in Salina, Kansas. The company is owned by Kontoor Brands, a spin-off of VF Corporation's Jeanswear Division. Since 2019 its headquarters has been in Greensboro, North Carolina, relocated from Merriam, Kansas.  The company states that it is an international retailer and manufacturer of casual wear and work wear and that it has more than 400 employees in the United States. In Australasia, the brand has been owned by Pacific Brands since 2007, after it was acquired from Yakka.

History

The company was formed in 1889 by Henry David Lee as the HD Lee Mercantile Company at Salina, Kansas, producing dungarees and jackets. The growth of Lee was prompted by the introduction of the Union-All work jumpsuit in 1913 and their first overall in 1920. Later in the 1920s Lee introduced a zipper fly and continued to expand. Around this time, the first children's overalls line was sold. In 1928 H.D. Lee, founder and president of The H.D. Lee Mercantile Company, died. During the 1930s and 1940s the company became the leading manufacturer of work clothes in the US. In 1944, the Lazy "S" became the official Lee back pocket. A flood wiped out Lee's Kansas City distribution center. It ruined the entire stock of merchandise, except the Buddy Lee dolls, which floated. In 1954, Lee expanded into casual wear. During the 1960s the company expanded to 81 countries and in 1969 was acquired by VF Corporation, becoming a brand. Lee aired its first television advertisement, which promoted Lee western wear.

In the 1970s Lee shifted its focus from the workwear business and began catering to fashion cycles. Lee created an all-new fit for women under the Ms. Lee label. A youth wear line for boys and girls was introduced. In 1996, the company launched Lee National Denim Day as part of National Breast Cancer Awareness Month. Working with the Entertainment Industry Foundation, Lee National Denim Day has raised over $75 million to help fund breast cancer research programs. In 2014, the brand was relaunched in Paris via the Citadium Paris store. In 2019, Lee, Wrangler, Rock & Republic, and VF Outlet were separated from VF Corporation into Kontoor Brands.

Manufacturing
In 1981, 240 factory workers in Greenock, Scotland, staged a sit-in in protest against plans to move the factory to Northern Ireland. What was planned as a one-night protest continued for seven months. , Lee Jeans have been manufactured by Arvind Mills, in a number of small factories in Chamarajanagar, India. About 60,000 workers produce 5,000 pairs of jeans a day.

Advertising
Within the United States, the company spends more than $40 million per year on advertising. In 2009, Olson was appointed as the lead interactive agency for the American brand and redesigned their website. Barkley Inc. had previously handled interactive advertising for the brand. Arnold Worldwide continues to provide offline advertising services for the brand.

See also
Rock & Republic

References

Further reading

External links
 Lee Jeans
 Lee Jeans Australia
 Lee National Denim Day

Clothing brands of the United States
Manufacturing companies based in Kansas
Salina, Kansas
Companies based in North Carolina
Clothing companies established in 1889
1920s fashion
1930s fashion
1940s fashion
1950s fashion
1960s fashion
1970s fashion
1980s fashion
1990s fashion
2000s fashion
2010s fashion
1889 establishments in Kansas
Jeans by brand
1969 mergers and acquisitions